Dark cabaret has come to define a particular musical genre that draws on the aesthetics of burlesque, vaudeville and Weimar-era cabaret, with live performances that borrow from the stylings of goth and punk.

Dark cabaret as a style
One of the earliest bands to play mainly or exclusively in a style which might now be described as dark cabaret were the Tiger Lillies, formed in London in 1989. In the 1980s satirical cabaret had been revived and popularised by London-based bands such as Fascinating Aïda and Kit and The Widow but the Tiger Lillies incorporated themes of blasphemy, prostitution and bestiality in their songs, sung by Martyn Jacques in a menacing style with a falsetto voice. 

A collaboration between Rozz Williams and Gitane Demone - both former members of Christian Death, entitled Dream Home Heartache after a song by Roxy Music, was recorded in the Netherlands and released in the United States in 1995 and was described by reviewers as "cabaret noir" or "glam cabaret". Following her 1996 debut solo album Quintessentially Unreal, San Francisco-based singer/pianist Jill Tracy released her second CD, Diabolical Streak, in 1999. Canada's Shift magazine called the album one of the "Top 10 Neo-Cabaret albums of all time."

Emergence of the genre

The term dark cabaret appears to have become popularized with the release of a 2005 compilation album entitled Projekt Presents: A Dark Cabaret by Projekt Records, a label chiefly associated with the dark wave genre. The album included "Flowers" from Dream Home Heartache sung by Rozz Williams together with, among others, "Evil Night Together" by Jill Tracy,  "Sometimes, Sunshine" by Revue Noir, and "Coin-Operated Boy" by The Dresden Dolls. Formed by Amanda Palmer and Brian Viglione in 2000, The Dresden Dolls described their music as "Brechtian punk cabaret", a term coined by Amanda Palmer in early 2003 in part to preclude being labelled by the media as goths. 

Nevertheless, with their musical style and appearance in white face makeup and reduced period clothing, The Dresden Dolls and their fans quickly became the most readily identified with the newly evident dark cabaret genre, garnering the most mainstream attention. Subsequently, other bands began categorising themselves and their performance as dark cabaret, such as Katzenjammer Kabarett in France, or Ray Childish in Graz, Austria.

New sects of the genre emerged, abandoning the theatrical side of dark cabaret this time in favor of jazz, rock, and metal influences. Bands such as Stolen Babies, Birdeatsbaby, and Harlequin Jones are closely associated with the dark cabaret subgenre.

The appearance of an identifiable dark cabaret scene coincided with the rise of Neo-Burlesque starting in the 1990s. The two have become linked following the appearance of performers such as the Chicago burlesque orchestra Apartment (1997–2005) and the emergence of gothic bellydance. Collaboration with burlesque performers was given by Brian Viglione as the inspiration for The Dresden Dolls' look.

Record labels
 Projekt Records
 No Comment Records
 The End Records

See also
 List of dark cabaret artists

References

20th-century music genres
21st-century music genres
 
Alternative rock genres
Cabaret
Dark music genres